Alice Springs was an electoral division of the Legislative Assembly in Australia's Northern Territory. One of the Legislative Assembly's original electorates, it was first contested at the 1974 election, and was named after the town of Alice Springs. It was abolished in 1983 and replaced by the new seats of Araluen, Braitling and Sadadeen.

Members for Alice Springs

Election results

Elections in the 1970s

 Preferences were not distributed.

 Preferences were not distributed.

 Preferences were not distributed.

Elections in the 1980s

References

Former electoral divisions of the Northern Territory